Inez Asher (née Inez Harriett Silverberg; January 1, 1911 – May 8, 2006) was a novelist and television writer.

Early years
Inez Asher was the only child of Minor Silverberg, a Des Moines, Iowa real estate agent, and Edna Harris Silverberg. When Inez was six years old, General Frederick Funston was holding her in his arms as he collapsed and died from a heart attack in the lobby of The St. Anthony Hotel in San Antonio, Texas. Inez was a member of the class of 1928, Theodore Roosevelt High School, attended Miss Orton's Classical School for Girls and UCLA; she was elected to Phi Beta Kappa in her junior year.

Radio and television writer
Asher co-wrote the episode "Robert E. Lee" for the Famous Children of History radio program. With Emilie Roberts, Asher composed a short lecture, "Irene Talking."
Asher wrote "The Last Orchid", the first episode of the Philco Players television program (1948).  Asher wrote for [[Lassie (1954 TV series)|the 1954 televised series of Lassie]]. and wrote the Welcome to Washington/Claudette Colbert Show of the Colgate Theatre.

Political
Like many Hollywood writers of the 1930s, Asher was singled out for her left-wing views. In 1934 she was listed in Elizabeth Dilling's self-published The red network; a "who's who" and handbook of radicalism for patriots.

Novelist and poet
Asher published one novel, Family Sins (Pinnacle Books, New York 1983), the story of an American widow who travels to the Orient in pursuit of a Korean orphan and ends up in the arms of a handsome but married Japanese doctor. Asher was co-author (with illustrator Alice Rovinsky) of two illustrated books of verse: Look at Me! A See Yourself Book for Boys and Look at Me! A See Yourself Book for Girls (Garden City Books, Garden City, New York 1951). Parents would paste a child's photo in the designated spot inside the back cover and as the child turned the pages he would see his face, through a hole cut in each page, in all the people he wanted to be: pilot, railroad conductor, etc. "Look at me, and you will see, all the things I'd like to be. If I were a fireman brave, Folks in danger I would save!" or "To be a cowboy, Bronco Bill, That would give me such a thrill!" Publishers Weekly called the books "A delightful novelty."

Personal
Asher was married to Alvin Asher, an attorney for MGM, and to James Marvin Hirsch.

Later years
Asher worked as a coordinator in the International Student Center at the University of California, Los Angeles. She died in Yonkers, New York, and is interred in the Home of Peace Cemetery (East Los Angeles).

References

American television writers
American women novelists
Writers from Los Angeles
American children's writers
Writers from Des Moines, Iowa
1911 births
2006 deaths
American women children's writers
American women dramatists and playwrights
20th-century American novelists
20th-century American dramatists and playwrights
20th-century American women writers
Novelists from Iowa
Screenwriters from California
Screenwriters from Iowa
American women television writers
20th-century American screenwriters
Theodore Roosevelt High School (Iowa) alumni
21st-century American women
Burials at Home of Peace Cemetery